Julia Cheiffetz is an American publisher, writer, and editor who currently lives in New York City.

Cheiffetz launched One Signal Publishers, an imprint of Atria Books, a division of Simon & Schuster. She has published Harold Bloom, Stanley Fish, Greg Graffin, Erica Jong, Gayle Tzemach Lemmon, Stephen Marche, Cass Sunstein, Jessica Valenti, and Sam Wasson, whose breakout bestseller Fifth Avenue, 5 A.M. was widely acclaimed.

Early life 
Julia was born on September 18, 1978, in Williamsville, New York. She received her bachelor's degree from Barnard College in 2000.

Career 
After graduating from Barnard, Cheiffetz taught English in Yokohama, Japan, as part of the JET Programme. In 2002 she started her publishing career as an Editorial Assistant at Random House.

Cheiffetz spent the first six years of her publishing career at Random House where she published the controversial anthology This Is Not Chick Lit and the debut works of many writers including Karen Abbott and Ed Park.

In 2008 Cheiffetz acquired Devil in the Grove by Gilbert King which won the 2013 Pulitzer Prize for Nonfiction and was called "a richly detailed chronicle of racial injustice" by the Pulitzer committee. The film adaptation is currently in development.

From 2011 to 2014 Cheiffetz was the Editorial Director of Amazon Publishing. At Amazon, Cheiffetz led the New York City-based adult trade publishing team under Larry Kirshbaum, publishing Deepak Chopra, Timothy Ferriss, and Penny Marshall. Cheiffetz resigned from Amazon in July 2013, and shortly after her departure other editors left the company. She later wrote about her experience in a post on Medium that went viral and helped lead to changes in Amazon's parental leave policies.

In 2014 Cheiffetz was hired as Executive Editor at HarperCollins, where she commissioned and edited the New York Times best-selling book Notorious RBG: The Life and Times of Ruth Bader Ginsburg by Irin Carmon and Shana Knizhnik. In August 2016 Cheiffetz commissioned a memoir by NBC correspondent Katy Tur on her time covering Donald Trump's campaign. On October 1, 2017, Unbelievable debuted at #2 on The New York Times best-seller list underneath Hillary Clinton's memoir What Happened.

In 2019 Cheiffetz founded One Signal Publishers, an imprint of Atria Books, a division of Simon & Schuster. She has stated she likes to publish books that are “nutritional candy.”

Personal life 
Cheiffetz currently resides in Brooklyn with her daughter and their dog.

She is on the Board of Directors of the Lower East Side Girls Club.

Bibliography

Selected bibliography as editor 
 This Is Not Chick Lit by Elizabeth Merrick (2006) 
 The Trouble with Poetry by Billy Collins (2007) 
 The Essential Feminist Reader by Estelle Freedman (2007) 
 Personal Days by Ed Park (2008) 
 Sin in the Second City by Karen Abbott (2008) 
 How to Write a Sentence by Stanley Fish (2011) 
 Fifth Avenue, 5 A.M. by Sam Wasson (2011) 
 Anarchy Evolution by Greg Graffin and Steve Olson (2011) 
 Till I End My Song by Harold Bloom (2011) 
 Devil in the Grove by Gilbert King (2012) 
 The Dressmaker of Khair Khana by Gayle Tzemach Lemmon (2012) 
 Notorious RBG by Irin Carmon and Shana Knizhnik (2015) 
 The World According to Star Wars by Cass R. Sunstein (2016) 
 Forward by Abby Wambach (2016) 
 Sex Object by Jessica Valenti (2017) 
 It's Okay to Laugh by Nora McInerny Permort (2017) 
 Stealing Fire by Steven Kotler and Jamie Wheal (2017) 
 Unbelievable by Katy Tur (2017) 
 The Woman Who Smashed Codes by Jason Fagone (2017) 
 Can It Happen Here? by Cass R. Sunstein (2018) 
 Rabbit by Patricia Williams and Jeannine Amber (2018) 
 The Gambler by William Rempel (2018) 
 Dear America by Jose Antonio Vargas (2019) 
 Hoax by Brian Stelter (2020) 
 Keep Moving by Maggie Smith (2020)

References 

1978 births
Living people
American book editors
Barnard College alumni
People from Buffalo, New York